Poyser is a surname. Notable people with the surname include:

Brian Poyser (died 2009), British actor 
Bryan Poyser (born 1975), American film director and screenwriter
Delroy Poyser (1962–2019), Jamaican long jumper
George Poyser (1910–1995), British football player and manager
George Poyser (politician) (1915–1986), Australian politician
James Poyser (born 1967), British-born American multi-instrumentalist, songwriter, pianist and music producer
John Rigby Poyser (1872-1954), British architect 
Victoria Poyser (born 1949), American artist

See also
T. & A. D. Poyser, ornithological publishers